The Women's 1500m athletics events for the 2016 Summer Paralympics took place at the Estádio Olímpico João Havelange from 8 to 17 September. A total of four events were contested over this distance for eight different classifications.

Schedule

Results

T11

17:38 17 September 2016:

T13

11:13 10 September 2016:

T20

11:09 16 September 2016:

T54

18:14 13 September 2016:

References

Athletics at the 2016 Summer Paralympics